Murgon is a rural town and locality in the South Burnett Region, Queensland, Australia.

Geography 
Murgon is in the region of Queensland known as the South Burnett, the southern part of the Burnett River catchment. Industries include peanuts, dairy farming, beef and cattle production and wine.  The Indigenous Australian settlement of Cherbourg is just south of Murgon.

History

Wakka Wakka (Waka Waka, Wocca Wocca, Wakawaka) is an Australian Aboriginal language spoken in the Burnett River catchment. The Wakka Wakka language region includes the landscape within the local government boundaries of the North and South Burnett Regional Council, particularly the towns of Cherbourg, Murgon, Kingaroy, Gayndah, Eidsvold and Mundubbera.

Opened on 14 September 1903, the fourth stage of the Nanango railway line took the line from Goomeri south to Wondai after passing through Manyung, Moondooner and Murgon. The fifth stage, opened on 19 December 1904, terminated at Kingaroy.

In July 1906, 32 allotments were advertised for selection by the Department of Public Lands Office. The map advertising the land selection states the allotments are portions in the Parishes of Murgon, Goomeribong and Barambah. The portions were left over from April 5.

Murgon State School opened on 24 February 1908.

Murgon Post Office opened by June 1908 (a receiving office had been open from 1904).

The first Murgon Methodist Church was officially opened on Sunday 4 October 1908. The foundation stone of the current Murgon Methodist Church (now the Murgon Goomeri Uniting Church) was laid on 17 March 1962. The current church opened in 1963.

The foundation stone of the Murgon War Memorial was laid on 25 April 1920 (ANZAC Day) by Lieutenant Colonel Wilder Neligan. On 11 November 1921, the digger memorial was dedicated by RSL chairman, Major General Spencer Browne.

The town was the administrative centre for the former Shire of Murgon which existed from 1914 until 2008.

Christ Church Anglican was dedicated in 1920.

Murgon Baptist Church opened on Sunday 30 October 1921. A tender to build the church was accepted in August 1921. On 31 July 1930, a new Baptist church was officially opened. The current church was opened in 1965, while the original church was sold to the Church of Christ in 1961.

St Joseph's Catholic School opened 27 February 1937.

Murgon State High School opened on 27 January 1959.

Murgon Special School closed on 31 December 1980.

The Theebine to Kingaroy line was officially closed in early 2010.

The current Murgon Library facility opened in 2010.

Heritage listings

Murgon has a number of heritage-listed sites, including:
 91 Gore Street: Murgon State School
 Macalister Street: former South Burnett Co-operative Dairy Association Factory
 62-70 Lamb Street: Murgon Civic Centre

Fossils
Murgon is also close to a famous fossil site. The Murgon fossil site is the only such site in Australia with a diverse vertebrate fauna dating to the early Eocene epoch, around 55 million years ago, only 10 million years after the extinction of the dinosaurs.

Education 
Murgon State School is a government primary (Early Childhood-6) school for boys and girls at 91 Gore Street. In 2018, the school had an enrolment of 242 students with 21 teachers and 23 non-teaching staff (14 full-time equivalent). It includes a special education program.

St Joseph's School is a Catholic primary (Prep-6) school for boys and girls at 32 Angel Avenue. In 2018, the school had an enrolment of 107 students with 12 teachers and 14 non-teaching staff (9 full-time equivalent).

Murgon State High School is a government secondary (7-12) school for boys and girls at 2 Dutton Street. In 2018, the school had an enrolment of 347 students with 43 teachers (41 full-time equivalent) and 30 non-teaching staff (24 full-time equivalent). It includes a special education program.

Amenities 
The South Burnett Regional Council operates a public library in Murgon at 42 Stephens Street West. Public Wi-Fi is available at this facility.

There are numerous churches in Murgon, including:

 Christ Church Anglican, 29 Taylor Street East
 St Joseph's Catholic Church, 24 Angel Avenue
 Murgon Goomeri Uniting Church, 55 Gore Street

Attractions 
Attractions of Murgon include winemaking, fishing on the nearby Bjelke-Petersen Dam and gem-fossicking.

The Queensland Dairy and Heritage Museum is at 2 Sommerville Street.

The Kilkivan to Kingaroy Rail Trail follows the old railway line between the two towns. The trail from Kilkivan to Murgon is unsealed. Short distances between towns means coffee is never far away. It passes the Local Heritage listed Railway Complex which includes the former railway station and station master’s residence, and what were a goods shed and platforms, and some railway tracks and the remains of the water tank stand.

Notable residents 
Notable residents of Murgon include:
 Gavin Cooper, Australian rugby league player born in Murgon
 Dustin Cooper, Australian rugby league player born in Murgon
 John Mickel, Member of the Queensland Legislative Assembly born in Murgon
 Leah Purcell, Australian actress, director and writer was born in Murgon.
 Steve Renouf, Australian rugby league player born in Murgon

See also

 List of fossil sites

References

External links

 University of Queensland: Queensland Places:Murgon and Murgon Shire

 
Towns in Queensland
South Burnett Region
Localities in Queensland